John McCormack (25 March 1921 - 21 September 1996) was the Roman Catholic Bishop of Meath, Ireland from 1968 to 1990.

Early life 
McCormack was born in Moynalty, County Meath on the 25 March 1921.  He was ordained a priest of the Cathedral Parish of Mullingar, in County Westmeath on 23 June 1946.  He went to Rome to Study in the Lateran University shortly afterwards and was awarded a degree in canon law.

Episcopal Ministry 
Following the death of John Anthony Kyne in 1968, Pope Paul VI named him as the Bishop of Meath. On 10 March 1968 he was consecrated as a bishop in the Cathedral of Christ the King, in Mullingar County Westmeath by William Cardinal Conway.

Retirement and death 
McCormack retired as Bishop of Meath on 16 May 1990 and was succeeded by Michael Smith.  He died on 21 September 1996.

References

External links
 Website of the Diocese of Meath

1921 births
1996 deaths
Roman Catholic bishops of Meath
Pontifical Irish College alumni
20th-century Roman Catholic bishops in Ireland